John FitzPatrick (24 April 1915 – 28 July 1997) was an Australian politician.

FitzPatrick was born and lived all of his life in Broken Hill, New South Wales and was a boilermaker before running for Parliament. He was elected for the Australian Labor Party as the federal member for Darling in rural New South Wales from 1969 to 1977 and as the member for Riverina from 1977 to 1980.

FitzPatrick served his first four terms as the member for Darling, based on Broken Hill. It had been one of the few country seats where Labor consistently did well; indeed, it had been in Labor hands for all but a few months since Federation. As a measure of how safe this seat was, he retained it in 1975 with a majority of seven percent even amid Labor's collapse that year.

Ahead of the 1977 federal election, Darling was abolished, and FitzPatrick opted to follow most of his constituents into neighbouring Riverina. That seat had previously been a safe National Country seat, but the addition of the heavily pro-Labor territory from Darling gave Labor a notional majority. FitzPatrick challenged the National Country incumbent, John Sullivan, and won narrowly. However, facing the prospect of a challenge from the popular mayor of Broken Hill City Council, Noel Hicks, FitzPatrick did not run for reelection in 1980.

Notes

1915 births
1997 deaths
Australian Labor Party members of the Parliament of Australia
Members of the Australian House of Representatives
Members of the Australian House of Representatives for Darling
Members of the Australian House of Representatives for Riverina
Australian boilermakers
20th-century Australian politicians
Australian people of Irish descent